Barbro Christina Oborg Ljunggren (born 3 July 1941) is a Swedish actress. She is married to Sten Ljunggren.

References

External links

1941 births
Living people
20th-century Swedish actresses
Actresses from Stockholm